In combinatorial optimization, Lin–Kernighan is one of the best heuristics for solving the symmetric travelling salesman problem. It belongs to the class of local search algorithms, which take a tour (Hamiltonian cycle) as part of the input and attempt to improve it by searching in the neighbourhood of the given tour for one that is shorter, and upon finding one repeats the process from that new one, until encountering a local minimum. As in the case of the related 2-opt and 3-opt algorithms, the relevant measure of "distance" between two tours is the number of edges which are in one but not the other; new tours are built by reassembling pieces of the old tour in a different order, sometimes changing the direction in which a sub-tour is traversed. Lin–Kernighan is adaptive and has no fixed number of edges to replace at a step, but favours small numbers such as 2 or 3.

Derivation
For a given instance  of the travelling salesman problem, tours are uniquely determined by their sets of edges, so we may as well encode them as such. In the main loop of the local search, we have a current tour  and are looking for new tour  such that the symmetric difference  is not too large and the length  of the new tour is less than the length  of the current tour.
  — the gain of using  when switching from  —
since : how much longer the current tour  is than the new tour . It is however easier to do those tests in the opposite order: first search for plausible  with positive gain, and only second check if  is in fact a tour.

Hence (essentially by Hierholzer's algorithm for finding Eulerian circuits) the graph  decomposes into closed alternating trails.

Key idea
Alternating trails (closed or open) are built by extending a shorter alternating trail, so when exploring the neighbourhood of the current tour , one is exploring a search tree of alternating trails. The key idea of the Lin–Kernighan algorithm is to remove from this tree all alternating trails which have gain . This does not prevent finding every closed trail with positive gain, thanks to the following lemma.

Lemma. If  are numbers such that , then there is a cyclic permutation of these numbers such that all partial sums are positive as well, i.e., there is some  such that
  for all .

For a closed alternating trail , one may define  if  and  if ; the sum  is then the gain . (Prior to that the search may have considered other subtrails of  starting at other vertices but backed out because some subtrail failed the positive gain constraint.) Reducing the number of branches to explore translates directly to a reduction in runtime, and the sooner a branch can be pruned, the better.

This yields the following algorithm for finding all closed, positive gain alternating trails in the graph.

 For all , push  onto the stack.
 While the stack is nonempty:
The current alternating trail is now .
 If  is even then:
 For each  such that  (there are at most two of these), push  onto the stack.
 If instead  is odd then:
 If  then report  as a closed alternating trail with gain .
 Stop

As an enumeration algorithm this is slightly flawed, because it may report the same trail multiple times, with different starting points, but Lin–Kernighan does not care because it mostly aborts the enumeration after finding the first hit. It should however be remarked that:
 Lin–Kernighan is not satisfied with just having found a closed alternating trail  of positive gain, it additionally requires that  is a tour.
 Lin–Kernighan also restricts the search in various ways, most obviously regarding the search depth (but not only in that way).
 In most iterations one wishes to quickly find a better tour , so rather than actually listing all siblings in the search tree before exploring the first of them, one may wish to generate these siblings lazily.

Basic Lin–Kernighan algorithm
The basic form of the Lin–Kernighan algorithm not only does a local search counterpart of the above enumeration, but it also introduces two parameters that narrow the search.
 The backtracking depth  is an upper bound on the length of the alternating trail after backtracking; beyond this depth, the algorithm explores at most one way of extending the alternating trail. Standard value is that .
 The infeasibility depth   is an alternating path length beyond which it begins to be required that closing the current trail (regardless of the gain of doing so) yields an exchange to a new tour. Standard value is that .
Because there are  alternating trails of length , and the final round of the algorithm may have to check all of them before concluding that the current tour is locally optimal, we get  (standard value ) as a lower bound on the exponent of the algorithm complexity. It appears unlikely that the worst-case running time is polynomial.

In terms of a stack as above, the algorithm is:
Input: an instance  of the travelling salesman problem, and a tour 
Output: a locally optimal tour
Variables: 
 the sequence  of vertices in the current alternating trail, 
 the best set  of exchange edges found for current tour, and its corresponding gain .
Initialise the stack to being empty.
Repeat
 For all , push  onto the stack.
 While the stack is nonempty:
 If  is even then
 for each  such that ,
 else ( is odd):
 End if.
 Let  be the top element on the stack (peek, not pop). If  then
 if  then 
 set  (update current tour) and clear the stack.
 else if  then
 end if
 end if
 end while
until .
Return 

The length of the alternating trails considered are thus not explicitly bounded, but beyond the backtracking depth  no more than one way of extending the current trail is considered, which in principle stops those explorations from raising the exponent in the runtime complexity.

Limitations
The closed alternating trails found by the above method are all connected, but the symmetric difference  of two tours need not be, so in general this method of alternating trails cannot explore the full neighbourhood of a trail . The literature on the Lin–Kernighan heuristic uses the term sequential exchanges for those that are described by a single alternating trail. The smallest non-sequential exchange would however replace 4 edges and consist of two cycles of 4 edges each (2 edges added, 2 removed), so it is long compared to the typical Lin–Kernighan exchange, and there are few of these compared to the full set of 4-edge exchanges.

In at least one implementation by Lin & Kernighan there was an extra final step considering such non-sequential exchanges of 4 edges before declaring a tour locally optimal, which would mean the tours produced are 4-opt unless one introduces further constraints on the search (which Lin and Kernighan in fact did). The literature is vague on exactly what is included in the Lin–Kernighan heuristic proper, and what constitutes further refinements.

For the asymmetric TSP, the idea of using positive gain alternating trails to find favourable exchanges is less useful, because there are fewer ways in which pieces of a tour can be rearranged to yield new tours when one may not reverse the orientation of a piece. Two pieces can only be patched together to reproduce the original tour. Three pieces can be patched together to form a different tour in one way only, and the corresponding alternating trail does not extend to a closed trail for rearranging four pieces into a new tour. To rearrange four pieces, one needs a non-sequential exchange.

Checking Hamiltonicity
The Lin–Kernighan heuristic checks the validity of tour candidates  at two points: obviously when deciding whether a better tour has been found, but also as a constraint to descending in the search tree, as controlled via the infeasibility depth . Concretely, at larger depths in the search a vertex  is only appended to the alternating trail if  is a tour.

If keeping track of more information, the test can instead be carried out in constant time.

A useful degree of freedom here is that one may choose the order in which step 2.3.2 iterates over all vertices; in particular, one may follow the known tour . The outcome of the Hamiltonicity test done when considering the th edge  depends only on in which of these paths that  resides and whether  is before or after .

References

External links
 LKH implementation
 Concorde TSP implementation
 LK Heuristic in Python

Combinatorial optimization
Combinatorial algorithms
Heuristic algorithms
Travelling salesman problem